Jack C.K. Teng (aka Teng Chuan-kai or Deng Chuankai; ; 7 September 1912 – 3 January 1999), was a Chinese educator, writer, politician, diplomat and Olympic pioneer. He is best known as the Chairman of the Chinese National Olympic Committee during the 1960 Summer Olympics, the first time a Chinese athlete won an Olympic medal.

Biography
Teng was born on 7 September 1912 in Jiangyin County, Jiangsu Province, to a wealthy and dominant family. In 1933, he graduated from the National Jinan University (Bachelor of Law). Teng worked for the Ministry of Foreign Affairs of the Republic of China.

In 1934, Teng was sent to the United States as an assistant consulate. He also studied at the University of Washington, Seattle, and graduated BA in 1936. In 1936, he was transferred to the embassy of China in Panama.

In March 1949, Teng was appointed the President of National Yingshi University (a precursor of the current Zhejiang University). In 1949, Teng went to Taiwan. From March 1961 to 5 December 1969, he was the Vice-minister of the Ministry of Education (Republic of China). On 14 April 1977, he became the Minister of Personnel of the Examination Yuan.

From December 1957 to September 1962, Teng was the Chairman of the Chinese Olympic Committee.

Teng died on 3 January 1999 in Taipei, Taiwan.

Scouting 

Teng served as the International Commissioner of the Boy Scouts of China. In 1974, Chuan was awarded the 92nd Bronze Wolf, the only distinction of the World Organization of the Scout Movement, awarded by the World Scout Committee for exceptional services to world Scouting.

Works
Boy Scouts World Scout Leaders Meeting of the Far East Seventh President of speech Quantikuaiyi / 1970.New Zealand
In Chinese:

References

External links

History of the Ministry of Education (Taiwan)
Overseas Chinese Association
Government Information Office (Taiwan)
complete list 
https://web.archive.org/web/20131014183020/http://www5.airnet.ne.jp/bsy87/Y87eng/eNews/08_BRZ/eY87_2008_brz_01a.html

University of Washington alumni
1912 births
1999 deaths
Taiwanese Ministers of Civil Service
Educators from Wuxi
Diplomats of the Republic of China
Republic of China writers
Chinese travel writers
Writers from Wuxi
Taiwanese sportsperson-politicians
Academic staff of the National Taiwan Normal University
Jinan University alumni
Recipients of the Order of Brilliant Star
Taiwanese people from Jiangsu
Recipients of the Bronze Wolf Award
Scouting in Taiwan
People from Jiangyin
Sportspeople from Wuxi